Maria de Naglowska (15 August 1883 – 17 April 1936) was a Russian occultist, mystic, author, journalist, and poet who wrote and taught about sexual magical ritual practices while also being linked with the Parisian surrealist movement. She established and led an occult society known as the Confrerie de la Flèche d'Or (Brotherhood of the Golden Arrow) in Paris from 1932 to 1935. Naglowska's occult teaching centered on what she called the Third Term of the Trinity, in which the Holy Spirit of the classic Christian trinity is recognized as the divine feminine. Her practices aimed to bring about a reconciliation of the light and dark forces in nature through the union of the masculine and feminine, revealing the spiritually transformative power of sex.

Biography

Naglowska was born in 1883 in St. Petersburg, Russia, the daughter of a provincial governor of Kazan. She was orphaned at age 12 and educated in the exclusive private and aristocratic Institute Smolna. Following a rift with her aristocratic family caused by her falling in love with a Jewish commoner, Moise Hopenko, she moved with him first to Berlin and then to Geneva where they were married and subsequently had three children. Around 1910, Hopenko abandoned her to move to Palestine. Naglowska earned a living as a school teacher. She also worked as a journalist but her radical writings led to her imprisonment and eventual expulsion from Switzerland after which she moved to Rome around 1920.

While in Rome she again worked as a journalist and became acquainted with Julius Evola.

In 1929, she moved to Paris. In order to support herself, she conducted occult seminars drawing upward of 40 people to hear her ideas on sex magic. Attendance at these sessions included notable avant-garde writers and artists such as Evola, William Seabrook, Man Ray, and André Breton. These gatherings eventually led to the establishment of the Brotherhood of the Golden Arrow.

Her events apparently were quite controversial. In 1935, Naglowska presented a speech at the Club de Faubourg in which she was billed as the "High Priestess of Love of the Temple of the Third Era" and speaking on the topic of "Magic and Sexualitly:  What is Magic Coitus?  What is the Symbolic Serpent." The club was tried and convicted for "outrage to public decency" but later successfully appealed the conviction.

During her time in Paris, she also published a newspaper called La Flèche (The Arrow) to which she and other occultists, including Evola, contributed articles. The paper released twenty issues over the course of its three-year existence.

In 1931, she compiled, translated and published in French a collection of published and unpublished writings by American occultist Paschal Beverly Randolph on the subject of sexual magic and magic mirrors. Her translation and publication of Randolph's previously little known ideas and teachings was the source of Randolph's subsequent influence in European magic.   She augmented the text with what she claimed were some of his oral teachings.

The following year, she published a semi-autobiographical novella, Le Rite Sacré de l'amour magique (The Sacred Ritual of Magical Love.)

Later that year, she also published La Lumière du sexe (The Light of Sex), a mystic treatise and guide to sexual ritual that was required reading for those seeking to be initiated into the Brotherhood of the Golden Arrow.

Her later book on advanced sexual magic practices, Le mystère de la pendaison (The Hanging Mystery) details her advanced teachings on the Third Term of the Trinity and the spiritually transformative power of sex, and the practice of erotic ritual hanging and other sensory deprivation practices.

Beyond occult subjects, Maria Naglowska also influenced the surrealist art movement. The "Lexique succinct de l'érotisme" in the catalog of the 1959 International Surrealist Exhibition in Paris noted her important influence. Surrealist Sarane Alexandrian wrote a detailed account of her life.

In 1935, Naglowska had a dream foretelling her death and shortly thereafter went to live with her daughter in Zurich. She died there, at the age of fifty-two, on April 17, 1936.

In 2011 and 2012, Naglowska's works were for the first time translated into English and published in the United States by Inner Traditions, translated by Donald Traxler and accompanied with a foreword by Hans Thomas Hakll.

Employment of Satanic Symbolism

Julius Evola, in his book Eros and the Mysteries of Love: The Metaphysics of Sex  claimed that Naglowska often wrote for shock effect noting her "deliberate intention to scandalize the reader through unnecessarily dwelling on Satanism."   It may have been for such scandalous and provocative effect that she used Satanic rhetoric and imagery or it may have been for a more sophisticated symbolic illustration in her message. She referred to herself as "a Satanic woman."  She explicitly encourage her disciples to imagine Satan as a force within humanity rather than as an external actual evil, destructive spirit. She proclaimed that "Reason is in the service of Satan." She employs Satan as a symbol for  man's desire for joy and freedom when she writes, "My Brothers, the Venerable Warriors of the Golden Arrow, will say: 'The Free Man in you was Satan, and He wanted eternal joy, but you, Freed Brother, you decided otherwise, because you were not only Satan but also He who lives, being Life."

Ritual practice

One ritual for which there exists a first-hand account recalls that the ceremony included a naked Naglowska lying supine upon the altar while a male initiate places a chalice upon her genitalia and proclaims, "I will strive by any means to illuminate myself, with the aid of a woman who knows how to love me with virgin love...I will research with companions the initiatory erotic act, which, by transforming the heat into light arouses Lucifer from the satanic shades of masculinity."

Published works

Magia Sexualis: Sexual Practices for Magical Power by Paschal Beverly Randolph, Maria de Naglowska and Donald Traxler (Inner Traditions, 2012)

The Sacred Rite of Magical Love: A Ceremony of Word and Flesh by Maria de Naglowska and Donald Traxler (Inner Traditions, 2012)

The Light of Sex: Initiation, Magic, and Sacrament by Maria de Naglowska, Donald Traxler and Hans Thomas Hakl (Inner Traditions, 2011)

Advanced Sex Magic: The Hanging Mystery Initiation by Maria de Naglowska and Donald Traxler (Inner Traditions, 2011)

References

1883 births
1936 deaths
Emigrants from the Russian Empire to France
Writers from Saint Petersburg
French occult writers
French Satanists
Russian women writers
Russian spiritual writers
Women mystics
20th-century occultists
French spiritual writers